Erasmus Jones (17 December 1817 – 9 January 1909) was a Welsh-American minister and author.

Jones was born in the parish of Llanddeiniolen, Caerns. Before emigrating to New York in 1833 with his brother, he attended school at Pentir, located near Bangor. Upon his arrival in the United States, he moved between New York City, Trenton, New Jersey, and Remsen, New York. In 1848, he entered the ministry of the Methodist Episcopal Church. Whilst being a part of the Church, he returned to Wales in 1852 to preach. However, he returned to America to serve as a chaplain in the army but after, went on to ministering to numerous churches in Oneida County (including several other places), until he settled in Utica.

Works
Jones also published several books over a span of 30 years. These included: 
 The Higher Law Triumphant: The Captive Youths of Judah (published 1856) 
 The Adopted Son of the Princess (which was awarded a prize at the Utica 'eisteddfod' in 1870) 
 The Welsh in America (published 1876 when it appeared in The Atlantic Monthly) 
 Llangobaith: A Story of North Wales (published 1886)
 Gold, Tinsel and Trash (published 1890)

Death
Jones died January 9, 1909.

References

Further reading

American Methodist clergy
Welsh Methodist ministers
19th-century American writers
19th-century Welsh writers
1817 births
1909 deaths
Welsh emigrants to the United States
People from Trenton, New Jersey
People from Remsen, New York
People from New York City
19th-century Methodists
19th-century American clergy